Prionoptera socorrensis is a species of moth of the family Noctuidae first described by Paul Dognin in 1912. It is found in Colombia.

References

Catocalinae